The Edmontosaurus mummy SMF R 4036 is an exceptionally well-preserved dinosaur fossil in the collection of the Naturmuseum Senckenberg (SM) in Frankfurt am Main, Germany. Found in 1910 in Wyoming, United States, it is ascribed to the species Edmontosaurus annectens (originally Trachodon), a member of the Hadrosauridae ("duckbilled dinosaur"). The fossil comprises a nearly complete skeleton that was found wrapped in impressions of its skin, a rare case of exceptional preservation for which the term "dinosaur mummy" has been used. Notably, the horny beak is preserved with this specimen. Plant remains found within the thorax cavity had been interpreted as stomach contents, although later research questioned this identification. The mummy's hands are wrapped in skin impression, which was interpreted as evidence for interdigital webbing and an aquatic lifestyle in hadrosaurids; this hypothesis, although universally accepted once, is now widely refused. SMF R 4036 is one of the four best preserved hadrosaurid mummies, and was the second to be discovered. The find was made by fossil hunter Charles Hazelius Sternberg and his sons, who sold their numerous finds to various museums in North America and Europe. Only two years earlier the Sternbergs had discovered the Edmontosaurus mummy AMNH 5060 in the same region, which is now on display at the American Museum of Natural History (AMNH) in New York City.

History of discovery 

The mummy was discovered in the summer of 1910 by the Sternberg family, a family of commercial fossil hunters consisting of Charles Hazelius Sternberg and his three sons Charles Mortram, George and Levi, in rocks of the Lance Formation in Converse County (today Niobrara County). The family had worked in this area since 1908, when they discovered the similar Edmontosaurus mummy AMNH 5060, which was acquired by the American Museum of Natural History in New York City. In 1908 and 1909, they also had found two skulls of the horned dinosaur Triceratops, one of which was sold to the British Museum of Natural History in London, while the other was likewise acquired by the American Museum. In 1910, preceding the discovery of the mummy, the party had excavated an Edmontosaurus skeleton and four Triceratops skulls, two of which were acquired by the Senckenberg Museum.

The SMF R 4036 mummy comes from the southern Schneider Creek area. Charles Mortram, who had so far been unsuccessful in finding specimens that season, discovered the parts of the tail weathering out of the sandstone as he roamed the area in search for fossils with his brother Levi. The party moved its camp to the site on 4 September. The equipment consisted of four horses, a heavy lumber wagon, and a buggy; the party was joined by the local Lon Galbreath. The recovery of the fossil was the most elaborate the family had ever undertaken. Since the Sternbergs had no pulley, the block was lifted step by step, by elevating it using levers of poplar wood and subsequently shovelling sand underneath. The excavation and transport took two months and a half to complete.

Charles Hazelius offered the fossil Fritz Drevermann, palaeontologist and head of the paleontology department of the Naturmuseum Senckenberg, for sale. Drevermann was able to pay the required sum of money thanks to a donation from the industrialist Arthur von Weinberg. Shortly after Drevermann's commitment, Sternberg received an offer from the Canadian Museum of Nature in Ottawa. The museum offered twice the amount of money for the fossil, including assembly, than Sternberg was to receive from the Senckenberg Museum without assembly. Sternberg wrote in 1917:

The mummy had been prepared at the Senckenberg museum between 1912 and 1920; it was among the first fossils prepared using compressed air tools, a technique invented at the Senckenberg museum in the 1910s. In 1963/1964, the mummy was relocated into a newly built cellar, the "Trachodon cellar", which allows viewing the fossil not only from the sides but also from the room above. Dubbed "duckbill" by the museum, it is one of the Senckenberg's museums most valuable fossils.

Significance and classification 
The Senckenberg specimen was the second "dinosaur mummy", a term originally coined by American paleontologist Henry Fairfield Osborn in 1911 for the Edmontosaurus mummy of the American Museum. This term was later used to refer to a handful of similar hadrosaurid ("duck-billed dinosaurs") specimens with extensive skin impressions, all of which have been discovered in North America. A third mummy specimen was discovered by Barnum Brown 1912 in Alberta, Canada, and subsequently described as the new genus Corythosaurus. Yet another mummy was discovered by Charles Hazelius Sternberg and acquired by the British Museum. When transported to London during World War I. in 1916, the carrying ship, the SS Mount Temple, was sunk by a German raider ship, resulting in the loss of the mummy as well as many other fossils discovered by Sternberg. After these initial finds, no more mummy specimens were discovered until 2000, when a Brachylophosaurus mummy nicknamed "Leonardo" was discovered in the Judith River Formation of Montana. Another Edmontosaurus mummy, nicknamed "Dakota", was excavated from the Hell Creek Formation of North Dakota in 2006.

The mummy belongs to the species Edmontosaurus annectens within the Hadrosauridae, a family of ornithischian ("bird-hipped") dinosaurs. It was initially referred to the genus Trachodon, which encompassed nearly all known hadrosaurid specimens at that time. Since 1942, the mummy was referred to the species Anatosaurus copei, which in 1990 was placed within its own genus, Anatotitan. Anatotitan copei is now regarded as a synonym of Edmontosaurus annectens by most researchers. The majority of dinosaur skin impressions are referable to the Hadrosauridae. In North American specimens from the Maastrichtian age, skin impressions are 31 times more abundant in association with hadrosaurid specimens than with any other group. The reasons for this distribution is unclear. Of all known hadrosaurid skin impressions, 25% belong Edmontosaurus.

Description 

The mummy shows a similar degree of preservation to that of the AMNH 5060 mummy of the American Museum. Its skeleton is almost completely preserved lacking only one hind limb and the end of the tail; it is more complete than the AMNH mummy. The skull is completely preserved, including the horny beak. According to Charles Hazelius, the trunk and skull together measured  and the tail  when found. The forelimbs are oriented backwards and upwards, and the skull elevated relative to the trunk. The preserved hind limb had its fibula and tibia (shin) folded against the femur (upper thigh), while the foot is pointing downwards. The bones of the mummy are fully  (still in their original anatomical position) and mostly preserved three-dimensionally, not flattened as with many other fossils. Skin impressions are preserved from the right side of the trunk and the neck as well as from both forearms. Most of the skin impressions had been separated from the skeleton during preparation.

Paleobiology

Supposed aquatic lifestyle and posture 

The fingers of both the Senckenberg and the AMNH mummy are partially connected to each other by an envelope of skin impressions. Based on the AMNH mummy, Osborn, in 1912, interpreted these impressions as interdigital webbing, indicating an aquatic lifestyle for hadrosaurids; this hypothesis was further strengthened by the discovery of similar skin envelopes in the Senckenberg mummy. The idea of an aquatic lifestyle had already been proposed in 1906 by Barnum Brown, who interpreted the great depth and flat sides of a hadrosaurid tail as evidence for its use in swimming. It was, however, only after the discovery of the two mummies that this idea became the universally accepted doctrine. In his 1911 account on the discovery of the SMF R 4036 mummy, Charles Hazelius Sternberg speculated that trachodons "[…] lived in the water, and only came on the land at the peril of their lives, as they had no means of defense against the king of carnivorous reptiles, Tyranosaurus [sic] […]". Doubts were not raised before 1964, when John H. Ostrom noted that hadrosaurids must have fed on resistant terrestrial plants rather than on soft aquatic ones, and that the skeleton was adapted for a bipedal locomotion on land. The hypothesis was finally refuted by Robert Bakker in 1986, who argued that the skin between the fingers was actually the remnant of a fleshy pad enveloping the hand that had dried out and flattened during mummification. Very similar skin structures derived from foot pads can be found on modern-day mummified camel carcasses. Furthermore, Bakker argued that the fingers were short and could hardly have been spread apart, which distinguishes them fundamentally from the long, spread toes of today's paddling animals such as ducks. Today, the hypothesis of an aquatic lifestyle is widely refuted.

In his 1911 account on the discovery of the mummy, Charles Hazelius Sternberg noted that the sprawling posture of the preserved hind limb is comparable to that of the AMNH mummy, and suggested that this could have reflected the original posture of the living animal — in contradiction with skeletal mounts of the time, which often showed more erect limbs. Sternberg noted: "He walked liked [sic] a lizard, with body close to the ground and tail dragging out behind."

Possible stomach contents 

Following the preparation of the mummy in Frankfurt, German paleobotanist Richard Kräusel studied an earthy mass of plant remains found within the thoracic cavity of the mummy, which he considered probable stomach contents based on their composition and location. This mass mostly comprised conifer needles (Cunninghamites elegans according to Kräusel), parts of tree branches, as well as seeds or fruits – these remains suggest a diet consisting of terrestrial plants. Kräusel presented his findings in 1921 at the annual meeting of the "Paläontologische Gesellschaft" in Frankfurt, the German paleontological society, where they were questioned immediately, probably due to the prevalent belief that hadrosaurids fed on aquatic instead of terrestrial plants, given their assumed aquatic lifestyle. In the discussions following the talk, Austrian paleontologist Othenio Abel argued that these remains could have simply been washed into the cadaver, a possibility that was considered unlikely by Kräusel, since pollen, fungi, or eggs of water insects, which he would have expected in a washed-in mass, are lacking. Swedish paleontologist Carl Wiman argued that stomach contents do not necessarily reflect the diet, since food items could have been swallowed accidentally, as indicated by plant remains found in specimens of the modern platypus. Drevermann, defending Kräusels hypothesis, argued that the remains had been found on the pubis bone of the mummy, where they could have fallen when the carcass was lying on its right side. Kräusel's presentation was, together with the subsequent discussions, published as short notes in the society's journal in 1922.

During the following century, the supposed stomach contents were often regarded as one of the best available evidence for the diet of Edmontosaurus and hadrosaurids in general, although the credibility of this evidence was repeatedly questioned. Although Sternberg had reported stomach contents from the AMNH mummy, these have never been studied. Ostrom, in his 1964 paper, cited the stomach contents of the Senckenberg mummy as further evidence for a diet consisting of terrestrial plants, questioning the aquatic lifestyle hypothesis which was universally accepted at the time. Later, different authors noted that since the mass was removed from the mummy and macerated, it would be no longer available for research, and that Kräusel's hypothesis can no longer be validated.

German paleontologist Dieter Uhl, in 2020, analyzed the available historic accounts, microscope slides of plant remains prepared by Kräusel, and additional plant remains found within the sandstone that surrounded the mummy, concluding that the presumed stomach or gut contents are probably external in origin. According to Uhl, the plant fragments described by Kräusel are much smaller than other known hadrosaurid gut contents and coprolites, and instead, compare well with the plant remains extracted from the surrounding rock that were transported by water. Uhl hypothesized that the mass of plant remains could have formed after most of the body cavity had already been filled with sand by the action of a river, leaving a chamber that acted as a sediment trap where the fine plant detritus suspended in the water accumulated.

Taphonomy 
The mummy was surrounded by brownish, fine to medium sandstone, although sedimentological structures that might hint at the mode of preservation are not visible in surviving rock samples, and have not been recorded by the Sternbergs. According to Uhl, however, it is likely that the sandstone surrounding the mummy was fluvial (laid down by rivers). This sandstone contains fine layers of plant material with pieces of charcoal, the latter indicating the occurrence of wild fires. The body cavity of the mummy contained fossils such as plant remains, leaf impressions, and a fish, which may have been washed inside the carcass after the death of the animal.

The AMNH 5060 mummy, which was discovered in the same area, is commonly interpreted as the fossil of a natural mummy that formed by dehydration of the carcass. This is indicated by the close adherence of the skin impressions to the bones, and the fact that they are partially drawn into the body cavity. The Sternbergs noted that the preservation of the Senckenberg mummy differed: the skin did not adhere closely to the bone, but rather traced the original body contour. This indicates that the carcass did not dry out before burial. In addition, the Senckenberg mummy was not preserved in a supine position like the Trachodon mummy, but in an upright position, with the tip of the muzzle pointing upwards and the legs pressed against the body. The Sternbergs suggested that the animal sank into soft sediment, possibly quicksand, and subsequently suffocated; the peculiar position of the specimen would have been the animal's death pose as it struggled to escape. Phil Manning stated in 2008 that the quicksand hypothesis cannot be confirmed by sediment samples of the site of discovery. The animal probably got buried very rapidly, however, resulting in its high degree of preservation. Uhl argued that the mummy probably was not transported over a long distance before burial, given the well-preserved skin impressions.

References

External links 

Saurolophines
Dinosaur fossils
Cretaceous fossil record
Paleontology in Wyoming
1910 in paleontology